Jones Jones Jones was an event held at the Wales Millennium Centre in Cardiff, Wales on the 3 November 2006, which broke the Guinness World Record for the largest gathering of people with the same surname—Jones.

Gala Concert

1,224 Joneses attended a Gala Concert in Cardiff featuring performances by Grace Jones, Dame Gwyneth Jones, John Owen-Jones and Tammy Jones, alongside a host of Welsh-speaking singers, actors and celebrities. During the evening, messages of support were shown from Aled Jones, Bryn Terfel, Stephen Jones, Ruth Jones, Rhys Meirion Jones and well wishes from Tom Jones and Catherine Zeta-Jones. The evening was co-presented by Gethin Jones, Gwenllian Jones and Aled Haydn Jones.

Past record holders
Also present on the evening were representatives of the past record holders, the Norbergs from Norberg, Sweden beating their record of 583.

Televised
The event was organised by the independent television production company Cwmni Da, events company Mr Producer of Cardiff and S4C. It was also televised on S4C on 26 November 2006.

Gallaghers take over record
As of Sunday 9 September 2007 the Gallaghers are holders of a Guinness World Record for "the largest same name gathering—last name". There were 1,488 Gallaghers who gathered in the LYIT Campus in Letterkenny, County Donegal, Ireland at the time of the count.

References and Related links

External links
Official website

Concerts in the United Kingdom
British television specials
S4C original programming
2006 in the United Kingdom
2006 in British television
November 2006 events in Europe
2006 in Wales